Hibbertia kaputarensis is a species of flowering plant in the family Dilleniaceae and is endemic to the Mount Kaputar area of New South Wales. It is a shrub with low-lying branches, oblong to lance-shaped leaves and yellow flowers with forty to about one hundred stamens arranged around three carpels.

Description
The flowers are arranged on short side shoots and are sessile. Flowering occurs from November to December.

Taxonomy
Hibbertia kaputarensis was first formally described in 1990 by Barry Conn in the journal Muelleria from specimens collected near the entrance to Mount Kaputar National Park in 1976.

Distribution and habitat
This hibbertia is common in heath and woodland, growing in rocky soils in the Mount Kaputar area.

References

kaputarensis
Flora of New South Wales
Taxa named by Barry John Conn
Plants described in 1990